The Color Code Personality Profile also known as The Color Code or The People Code is a personality inventory devised by Taylor Hartman. A 45-question personality test is used to assess one's color.

Classifying the motive types 
The Hartman Personality Profile is based on the notion that all people possess one of four driving "core motives". The Color Code is based on four types of personality, identified by color: Red, (motivated by power); Blue, (motivated by intimacy); White, (motivated by peace); and Yellow, (motivated by fun). Although demographic groups vary, the general breakdown suggests that Reds comprise 25% of the population; Blues 35%; Whites 20%; and Yellows 20%.

Reds 
Reds are power wielders. They use logic, vision and determination. From a Red perspective, emotion has nothing to do with completing tasks.

Strengths
Reds are: action-oriented, assertive, confident, decisive, determined, disciplined, independent, leaders, logical, pragmatic, proactive, productive, responsible, and task-dominant.

Limitations
Reds often need to be right. They may come across as harsh and critical, even when they don't mean to.  They tend to give priority to work over personal relationships. Reds may be poor listeners. They can also exhibit controlling and domineering traits.

Blues 
Life is a sequence of commitments for blues. They thrive on relationships and willingly sacrifice personal gain. Blues are highly demanding perfectionists. They can be distrusting and worry-prone. They are complex and intuitive and can be very opinionated. Blues can also be emotional and moody. Blues can be self-righteous and insecure and can also be very self-disciplined and sincere.

Strengths
Blues are steady, ordered and enduring. Blues love with passion. They bring culture and dependency to society and home. They are highly committed and loyal. They are comfortable in creative environments. They strive to be the best they can be.

Limitations
Blues are the most controlling of the four colors.  They can be insecure and judgmental. Lacking trust, they find themselves resentful or unforgiving. They often fail at seeing the positive side of life. They want to be loved and accepted, constantly seeking understanding from others while often refusing to understand and accept themselves.

Whites 
Motivated by peace, Whites will do anything to avoid confrontation. Their only demands from life are the things that make them feel comfortable. That feeling fosters their need to feel good inside.

Strengths
Whites are kind, considerate, patient, and accepting. They are devoid of ego. They are good at constructing thoughts that did not exist before, just from careful listening and taking time to think things through.

Limitations
Whites don't commonly share what they are feeling, understanding or seeing. They won't express conflict. Whites may be unwilling to set goals. They dislike working at someone else's pace. They can be somewhat self-deprecating.

Yellows 
Yellows are motivated by fun. They seek to have a great time.

Strengths
Yellows are enthusiastic, very persuasive, and spontaneous in nature. They are always looking for something new to do.

Limitations
They develop friendships with ease but can be very self-centered, keeping them from forming meaningful relationships. Often they have lots of friends, but only on a superficial level. Yellows may have difficulty getting down to business.

Criticism 
The Hartman Institute and its many subsidiaries offer "coaches" to businesses seeking to improve interpersonal relations, for career counseling, or to collect data for use in hiring practices. The test informally passes most psychometric measures of reliability and face validity, but this may be attributed to the open predictability of the test. The criteria are likely self-fulfilling to an extent. Although internal and small sample corporate-sponsored data have been reported, no peer-reviewed studies of the psychometric value of the test exist.

See also 
 Table of similar systems of comparison of temperaments

References 

Personality typologies